Psorosa is a genus of snout moths described by Philipp Christoph Zeller in 1846.

Species
Psorosa africana Balinsky, 1991
Psorosa dahliella (Treitschke, 1832)
Psorosa elbursella Amsel, 1954
Psorosa flavifasciella Hampson, 1901
Psorosa lacteomarginata (A. Costa, 1888)
Psorosa mechedella Amsel, 1954
Psorosa mediterranella Amsel, 1954
Psorosa myrmidonella Ragonot, 1901
Psorosa nucleolella (Möschler, 1866)
Psorosa ochrifasciella Ragonot, 1887
Psorosa tergestella Ragonot, 1901
Psorosa tochalella Amsel, 1954

References

Phycitini
Pyralidae genera